French Somaliland was a French colony in the Horn of Africa. It existed between 1884 and 1967, at which time it became the French Territory of the Afars and the Issas. The Republic of Djibouti is its legal successor state.

History
French Somaliland was formally established in 1896 after the Issa and Afar each signed a treaty with the French, but iterations of what will eventually become French Somaliland existed for few decades prior to the official formation.

On March 11, 1862, a treaty signed by Afar Sultan Raieta Dini Ahmet in Paris ceded the territory of Obock for 10,000 thalaris, around 55,000 francs. Later on, that treaty was used by Captain Alphonse Fleuriot de Langle to colonize the south of the Bay of Tadjoura. On March 26, 1885 the French signed another treaty with the Issa making the latter a protectorate under the French. No money changed hands and the Somalis did not sign away any of their land rights; the agreement was meant to protect their land from outsiders with the help of the French. However, after the French sailors of the Le Pingouin vessel were mysteriously killed in Ambado in 1886, the French first blamed the British, then the Somalis, using the incident to lay claim to the entire southern territory.

An attempt by Russian adventurer Nikolay Ivanovitch Achinov to establish a settlement at Sagallo in 1889 was promptly thwarted by French forces after just one month.

The construction of the Imperial Ethiopian Railway west into Ethiopia turned the port of Djibouti into a boomtown of 15,000 at a time when Harar was the only city in Ethiopia with a greater population. Although the city's population fell after the completion of the line to Dire Dawa and the bankruptcy (and subsequent government bail-out) of the original company, the rail link allowed Djibouti to quickly overtake the caravan-based trade out of Zeila (then in British Somaliland) and become the premier port for coffee and other goods leaving southern Ethiopia and the Ogaden through Harar.

The railway continued operating after the Italian conquest of Ethiopia but following the tumult of the Second World War, the area became a French overseas territory in 1946. In 1967, French Somaliland was renamed the French Territory of the Afars and the Issas and, in 1977, became the independent country of Djibouti.

See also
 List of governors of French Somaliland
 List of French possessions and colonies
 French colonial empire

References

Further reading

 

 
Somaliland, French
Somaliland
Somaliland
History of Djibouti
Horn of Africa
Somaliland
1896 establishments in Africa
1967 disestablishments in Africa
1896 establishments in the French colonial empire
1967 disestablishments in the French colonial empire
Djibouti–France relations
20th century in Djibouti

de:Geschichte Dschibutis#Kolonialzeit